Emil Ducu Ninu (born 28 August 1986) is a Romanian footballer who currently plays as a defender for Liga IV side Venus Independența.

Club career
On 16 July 2009 Ninu made a dream European Cup debut for Steaua in UEFA Europa League against Újpest FC. On 12 January 2015, he officially signed with Levski Sofia in the A PFG, but did not establish himself as a starter and left the team in the summer of the same year.

References

External links
 
 
 Емил Дуку Нину (Emil Ninu) at LevskiSofia.info 

1986 births
Living people
Romanian footballers
Romania under-21 international footballers
Romanian expatriate footballers
FC Progresul București players
FC Steaua București players
FC Steaua II București players
ACF Gloria Bistrița players
FCV Farul Constanța players
FC Gloria Buzău players
FC Universitatea Cluj players
PFC Levski Sofia players
AEK Larnaca FC players
Hapoel Bnei Lod F.C. players
Maccabi Ahi Nazareth F.C. players
ACS Viitorul Târgu Jiu players
Liga I players
Liga II players
First Professional Football League (Bulgaria) players
Cypriot First Division players
Liga Leumit players
Expatriate footballers in Bulgaria
Expatriate footballers in Cyprus
Expatriate footballers in Israel
Romanian expatriate sportspeople in Bulgaria
Romanian expatriate sportspeople in Cyprus
Romanian expatriate sportspeople in Israel
Association football defenders
Sportspeople from Craiova